Oleşeşti may refer to several villages in Romania:

 Oleşeşti, a village in Pârscov Commune, Buzău County
 Oleşeşti, a village in Țifești Commune, Vrancea County